The IPSC Australian Rifle Championship is an IPSC level 3 championship held once a year by IPSC Australia.

Champions 
The following is a list of current and previous champions.

Overall category

Senior category

Super Senior category

See also 
IPSC Australian Handgun Championship
IPSC Australian Shotgun Championship

References 

Match Results  - 2009 IPSC Australian Rifle Championship
Match Results  - 2010 IPSC Australian Rifle Championship
Match Results  - 2011 IPSC Australian Rifle Championship
Match Results  - 2012 IPSC Australian Rifle Championship
Match Results  - 2013 IPSC Australian Rifle Championship

IPSC shooting competitions
National championships in Australia
Shooting competitions in Australia